Neanthes may refer to:
 Neanthes (polychaete), a genus of polychaetes in the family Nereididae
 Neanthes, a genus of beetles in the family Cerambycidae; synonym of Acalolepta
 Neanthes of Cyzicus, Ancient Greek writer